César Valdovinos (born November 29, 1986, in Colima) is a former Mexican professional footballer who last played for Oaxaca  of Ascenso MX on loan from U. de G.

External links
Ascenso MX 

Living people
1986 births
Association football midfielders
Footballers from Colima
People from Colima City
Liga MX players
Ascenso MX players
Mexican footballers